Jacobus Petrus "Koos" Bekker (born 14 December 1952) is a South African billionaire businessman, and the chairman of media group Naspers. The company operates in 130 countries and is listed on the London Stock Exchange and Johannesburg Stock Exchange. It has the largest market capitalization of any media company outside the US, China and India. As of April 2022, his net worth was estimated at US$2.3 billion.

Early life
Koos Bekker was born in Potchefstroom, South Africa in 1952. He attended Hoër Volkskool Heidelberg and completed degrees at Stellenbosch University, in law and literature, and at Wits University, in law. He holds an MBA from Columbia Business School, New York and an honorary doctorate from Stellenbosch University.

Bekker is married to Karen Roos and has two children.

Career
After a few years in advertising, he received an MBA degree from Columbia Business School, graduating in 1984.  As a result of a project paper, he, with a few young colleagues, founded one of the first two pay-television services outside of the US.  M-Net and its sister companies, such as Multichoice, eventually expanded to 48 countries across Africa. In the 1990s, he was a founding director of mobile communication company MTN.  In 1997 Bekker became CEO of Naspers, one of the initial investors in the M-Net/Multichoice group.   Naspers bought out the other shareholders.  During his tenure, the market capitalization of Naspers grew from about $1.2 billion to $45 billion. His compensation package was unusual in that for fifteen years as CEO he earned no salary, bonus or perks. He was compensated solely via stock option grants that vested over time.

The Forbes 2019 list of The World's Billionaires ranked Bekker as the 1002nd-wealthiest person in the world, and the fourth-wealthiest South African, with a fortune of US$2.3 billion. In 2020, Bekker was ranked as the third-wealthiest South African by Forbes, with a fortune reported as US$2.4billion.

Foreign investments
Under Bekker, Naspers invested in pay television, mobile telephony and various internet services. The group conducts business in  Europe, Africa, Latin America, China, India, Russia, and various smaller countries.

Controversy 
Former South African Minister for Communications, Yunus Carrim testified to the Zondo Commission into State Capture that Bekker had played a significant role in irregularly pressuring government officials to protect MultiChoice's effective monopoly over South Africa's pay-TV sector. Carrim stated that this was done by lobbying government to prevent the opening up and rollout of encryption capacity in set-top boxes. MultiChoice has denied these allegations, noting that Carrim confirmed that he had no personal knowledge of any fraud or corruption on MultiChoice's part.

The Constitutional Court has held that Government's digital migration policy is not centered around individual players in the broadcasting industry and that the policy decision to dump decryption capability in government subsidized DTT set top boxes was in the best interests of the poor and the broader public. [Electronic Media Network Limited and Others v e.tv (Pty) Limited and Others 2017 (9) BCLR 1108 (CC).

Personal life
He is married, with two children, and resides in Cape Town, South Africa.

References

Columbia Business School alumni
Living people
Afrikaner people
South African businesspeople
Place of birth missing (living people)
South African chief executives
1952 births
South African billionaires